The Lindheimer House is located in the city of New Braunfels, county of  Comal, in the U.S. state of Texas.  It was added to the National Register of Historic Places listings in Comal County, Texas  in 1970, and designated a Recorded Texas Historic Landmark in 1936. The house is currently owned and run as a museum by the New Braunfels Conservation Society.

Ferdinand Lindheimer
Ferdinand Jacob Lindheimer (1801–1879) was known as the father of Texas Botany. Born in Frankfurt, Germany, Lindheimer emigrated to the United States in 1834 to escape persecution resulting from his political activities. After military participation in Texas, Lindheimer moved to St. Louis, Missouri to partner in botanical research with George Engelmann and Asa Gray. His research brought him in touch with John O. Meusebach, after which Lindheimer moved back to Texas where he spent the rest of his life.

Saltbox house
Lindheimer built his timber-framed house in 1852, in the saltbox style, with the roof at the back of his house sloping lower than the roof at the front of the house. Stucco covers the fachwerk totally on three sides of Lindheimer's house, but leaves it exposed in the back. A popular architecture style in New England, the saltbox house was also utilized among German immigrants in Texas. Rather than a full second story, Lindheimer's house has a loft as the second story. A centralized chimney heats the home. The front of the house has two transomed, paneled doors. In 1853, Lindheimer became the editor of the Die Neu Braunfels Zeitung, and published it out of his home for the next two decades, converting the rear of his house into a print shop. The New Braunfels Conservation Society operates the house as a museum.

See also

National Register of Historic Places listings in Comal County, Texas
Recorded Texas Historic Landmarks in Comal County
List of museums in Central Texas

References

External links

Library of Congress Historic Buildings Survey 
New Braunfels Conservation Society

Houses in Comal County, Texas
German-American culture in Texas
Houses on the National Register of Historic Places in Texas
Recorded Texas Historic Landmarks
Museums in Comal County, Texas
New Braunfels, Texas
National Register of Historic Places in Comal County, Texas